Banff Trail is a residential neighbourhood in the northwest quadrant of Calgary, Alberta. It is located northeast of the intersection of Crowchild Trail and Trans-Canada Highway, east of McMahon Stadium and the University of Calgary. The Banff Trail station of the C-train LRT system serves the community, which contains a large motel village in the southwest corner.

It is named for the town of Banff, which in turn takes its name from Banffshire, Scotland. The adjoining Highway 1 connects the city of Calgary to Banff and Banff National Park. The community has an Area redevelopment plan in place.

Demographics

Residents in this community had a median household income of $49,996 in 2000, and there were 25.8% low income residents living in the neighbourhood. As of 2000, 15.3% of the residents were immigrants. A proportion of 35.8% of the buildings were condominiums or apartments, and 46.4% of the housing was used for renting.

Education
The community is served by Branton Bilingual Junior High School  and William Aberhart Bilingual Senior High public schools. The University of Calgary grounds border the community to the west, and the Southern Alberta Institute of Technology to the south.

See also
List of neighbourhoods in Calgary

References

External links
Calgary Communities - Banff Trail Local Community Website
Federation of Calgary Communities - Banff Trail Community

Neighbourhoods in Calgary